Bruce Samazan (born 13 November 1970) is an Australian actor who appeared in several soap operas and drama series on Australian television and is the only male actor to have played regular roles in Australia's "Big Three" soap operas of the 1990s: E Street, Neighbours, and Home and Away

E Street
Samazan was a brickie's labourer until 1989 when he accompanied his girlfriend to an audition for a part in the Network Ten soap E Street. The series had debuted six months earlier to a lukewarm reception from audience and critics alike, and a major cast and crew re-shuffle was imminent. His girlfriend didn't get the part, but the casting director liked Bruce so much they offered him the part of a new character called Max Simmons, a new recruit at the community police station. Introduced early in Season 2, his role was primarily comic relief, but with the addition of ruthless killer Sonny Bennett to proceedings, E Street'''s storylines grew darker and the character of Max became more central and balanced. By 1992, Samazan was at the height of his fame, and won the 1992 Silver Logie as the Most Popular Actor on Australian television.

By the beginning of 1993, E Street's popularity had dwindled and the producers became more and more desperate to lure viewers. This resulted in one of the soap's more outrageous plots which involved Samazan's character Max turning into a werewolf. Although this scene was part of a dream sequence, it was at this point that the tabloid media began to speculate that E Street had "jumped the shark", and the series was cancelled in May 1993. Bruce stayed with the show until the final episode where his character fell in love with Bonnie Tate (Melissa Bell) who awoke from a coma just in time to see the final credits sequence.

In mid-1993, Samazan released a rap music single under the pseudonym B-Man Samazan on the Westside Records label called "One of a Kind", and filmed a music video for the song with Kellie Crawford from Teen Queens (and later of Hi-5 fame). The song peaked at No. 80 on the ARIA Charts in June 1993. Samazan's Neighbours co-star Scott Michaelson went on record during a 2003 court case saying Samazan had been lucky his song did not get too much airplay because it was "particularly bad".

Neighbours and Home and Away
After the demise of E Street, Bruce was immediately cast in Network Ten's other major soap series, Neighbours. He played Mark Gottlieb, brother of established character Stephen.

From Neighbours, he went straight into the Seven Network's Home and Away for a six-month guest stint as the psychotic Brad Cooper who raped Chloe Richards. He had previously guested on the serial as Mick in 1989 for four episodes.

Samazan returned to Neighbours in 2020, reprising his role as Mark Gottlieb for the show's 35th anniversary.

Post-acting career
After giving up acting in 2000, Samazan worked as a real estate agent in Wollongong for four years. He has worked for Real Estate Australia as a sales consultant. He reportedly spent four years at PRDnationwide Helensburgh finishing up in 2006.

He made a part-time return to acting, appearing in guest roles in Big Sky and Head Start''.

Samazan Pty Ltd, a company registered in 1991 which was directed by Bruce Samazan, was deregistered in late 2008.

Discography

Singles

References

External links

1970 births
Australian male television actors
Living people
Logie Award winners